The 2011 FIVB Beach Volleyball Swatch World Championships were a beach volleyball double-gender event, which were held from June 13 to 19, 2011 in Rome, Italy. The Swatch FIVB World Championships are organized every two years, and Italy hosted the event for the first time. 48 teams per gender entered the competition making 96 total.

Medal summary

Medal events

Medal table

Men's event

Round Robin

Pool A 

|}

Pool B 

|}

Pool C 

|}

Pool D 

|}

Pool E 

|}

Pool F 

|}

Pool G 

|}

Pool H 

|}

Pool J 

|}

Pool K 

|}

Pool L 

|}

Pool M 

|}

3rd place ranked teams 
The eight best third-placed teams will advance to the round of 32.

|}

Knockout round

Round of 32

Round of 16

Quarterfinals

Semifinals

Bronze medal Match

Gold medal Match

Women's event

Round Robin

Pool A 

|}

Pool B 

|}

Pool C 

|}

Pool D 

|}

Pool E 

|}

Pool F 

|}

Pool G 

|}

Pool H 

|}

Pool J 

|}

Pool K 

|}

Pool L 

|}

Pool M 

|}

3rd place ranked teams 
The eight best third-placed teams will advance to the round of 32.

|}

Knockout round

Round of 32

Round of 16

Quarterfinals

Semifinals

Bronze medal Match

Gold medal Match

References

External links
Men's tournament on FIVB website site
Women's tournament on FIVB website site

2011
World Championships
Beach volleyball
Beach volleyball